Patrick Anderson Browne (born 26 January 1982) is a Barbadian cricketer who has represented the West Indies at One Day International cricket.

Browne is a wicketkeeper-batsman and made his international debut during the West Indies' tour of South Africa in 2007–08.

External links
Cricinfo profile

1982 births
Living people
Barbadian cricketers
West Indies One Day International cricketers
Barbados cricketers
People from Saint Philip, Barbados
West Indies B cricketers
Wicket-keepers